Salad Farah Hassan is a Somali football manager who was most recently the manager of the Somalia national team.

Career
During the 2016–17 Somali First Division season, Farah was manager of Jeenyo United.

Farah managed the Somalia under-17 team during the 2018 CECAFA U-17 Championship, finishing runners-up in the process.

In June 2021, following the sacking of Abdellatif Salef, Farah took up the reigns of the Somalia national football team for games against Djibouti and Oman. In February 2022, Farah was replaced as Somalia manager by Pieter de Jongh.

References

Living people
Date of birth missing (living people)
Somalian football managers
Somalia national football team managers
Year of birth missing (living people)